Feta is a Greek brined white cheese made from sheep's milk or from a mixture of sheep and goat's milk. It is soft, with small or no holes, a compact touch, few cuts, and no skin. Crumbly with a slightly grainy texture, it is formed into large blocks and aged in brine. Its flavor is tangy and salty, ranging from mild to sharp. Feta is used as a table cheese, in salads such as Greek salad, and in pastries, notably the phyllo-based Greek dishes spanakopita "spinach pie" and tyropita "cheese pie". It is often served with olive oil or olives, and sprinkled with aromatic herbs such as oregano. It can also be served cooked (often grilled), as part of a sandwich, in omelettes, and many other dishes.

Since 2002, feta has been a protected designation of origin in the European Union. EU legislation and similar legislation in 25 other countries limits the name feta to cheeses produced in the traditional way in mainland Greece and Lesbos Prefecture, which are made from sheep's milk, or from a mixture of sheep's and up to 30% of goat's milk from the same area.

Similar white brined cheeses are made traditionally in the Balkans, around the Black Sea, in West Asia, and more recently elsewhere. Outside the EU, the name feta is often used generically for these cheeses.

Generic term and production outside Greece
For many consumers, the word feta is a generic term for a white, crumbly cheese aged in brine. Production of the cheese first began in the Eastern Mediterranean and around the Black Sea. Over time, production expanded to countries including Denmark, France, Germany, the United Kingdom and the United States, often partly or wholly of cow's milk, and they are (or were) sometimes also called feta.

Geographical Indication

Since 2002, feta has been a Protected Designation of Origin (PDO) product within the European Union. According to the relevant EU legislation (applicable within the EU and Northern Ireland), as well as similar UK legislation only those cheeses produced in a traditional way in particular areas of Greece, which are made from sheep's milk, or from a mixture of sheep's and up to 30% of goat's milk from the same area, can be called feta. Also in several other countries the term feta has since been protected. An overview is shown in the table below.

Description
The EU PDO for feta requires a maximum moisture of 56%, a minimum fat content in dry matter of 43%, and a pH that usually ranges from 4.4 to 4.6. Production of the EU PDO feta is traditionally categorized into firm and soft varieties. The firm variety is tangier and considered higher in quality. The soft variety is almost soft enough to be spreadable, mostly used in pies and sold at a cheaper price. Slicing feta produces some amount of trímma, "crumble", which is also used for pies (not being sellable, trímma is usually given away for free upon request).

High-quality feta should have a creamy texture when sampled, and aromas of ewe's milk, butter, and yoghurt. In the mouth it is tangy, slightly salty, and mildly sour, with a spicy finish that recalls pepper and ginger, as well as a hint of sweetness. According to the specification of the Geographical Indication, the biodiversity of the land coupled with the special breeds of sheep and goats used for milk is what gives feta cheese a specific aroma and flavor.

Production
Traditionally (and legally within the EU and other territories where it is protected), feta is produced using only whole sheep's milk, or a blend of sheep's and goat's milk (with a maximum of 30% goat's milk). The milk may be pasteurized or not, but most producers now use pasteurized milk. If pasteurized milk is used, a starter culture of micro-organisms is added to replace those naturally present in raw milk which are killed in pasteurization. These organisms are required for acidity and flavour development. 

The compacted curds are then chopped up and placed in a special mould or a cloth bag that allows the whey to drain. After several hours, the curd is firm enough to cut up and salt; salinity will eventually reach approximately 3%, when the salted curds are placed (depending on the producer and the area of Greece) in metal vessels or wooden barrels and allowed to infuse for several days. 

After the dry-salting of the cheese is complete, aging or maturation in brine (a 7% salt in water solution) takes several weeks at room temperature and a further minimum of 2 months in a refrigerated high-humidity environment—as before, either in wooden barrels or metal vessels, depending on the producer (the more traditional barrel aging is said to impart a unique flavour). The containers are then shipped to supermarkets where the cheese is cut and sold directly from the container; alternatively blocks of standardized weight are packaged in sealed plastic cups with some brine. 

Feta dries relatively quickly even when refrigerated; if stored for longer than a week, it should be kept in brine or lightly salted milk.

History

Cheese made from sheep and goat milk has been common in the Eastern Mediterranean since ancient times. In Bronze Age Canaan, cheese was perhaps among the salted foods shipped by sea in ceramic jars and so rennet-coagulated white cheeses similar to feta may have been shipped in brine, but there is no direct evidence for this. In Greece, the earliest documented reference to cheese production dates back to the 8th century BC and the technology used to make cheese from sheep-goat milk is similar to the technology used by Greek shepherds today to produce feta. In the Odyssey, Homer describes how Polyphemus makes cheese and dry-stores it in wicker racks, though he says nothing about brining, resulting perhaps, according to Paul S. Kindstedt, in a rinded cheese similar to modern pecorino and caprino rather than feta. On the other hand, E. M. Antifantakis and G. Moatsou state that Polyphemus' cheese was "undoubtedly the ancestor of modern Feta". Origins aside, cheese produced from sheep-goat milk was a common food in ancient Greece and an integral component of later Greek gastronomy.

The first unambiguous documentation of preserving cheese in brine appears in Cato the Elder's De Agri Cultura (2nd century BCE) though the practice was surely much older. It is also described in the 10th-century Geoponica. Feta cheese, specifically, is recorded by Psellos in the 11th century under the name prósphatos (Greek πρόσφατος 'recent, fresh'), and was produced by Cretans. In the late 15th century, an Italian visitor to Candia, Pietro Casola, describes the marketing of feta, as well as its storage in brine. Feta cheese, along with milk and sheep meat, is the principal source of income for shepherds in northwestern Greece.

The Greek word feta (φέτα) comes from the Italian fetta 'slice', which in turn is derived from the Latin offa 'morsel, piece'. The word feta became widespread as a name for the cheese only in the 19th century, probably referring to the cheese being cut to pack it in barrels.

Effect of Certification as a Geographical Indication
Prior to Greece's pursuit of a PDO for its feta, there was long-standing production out of Greece in three member states: Germany, Denmark and France, and in certain countries (e.g. Denmark) feta was perceived as a generic term, while it was perceived as a designation of origin in others (e.g. Greece), with the centre of production and consumption taking place in Greece. Greece first requested the registration of Feta as a designation of origin in the EU in 1994, which was approved in 1996 by commission regulation (EC) No 1107/96 The decision was appealed to the Court of Justice of the European Union (CJEU) by Denmark, France and Germany, which annulled the decision as the Commission did not evaluate sufficiently whether or not Feta had become a generic term. After that decision, the European Commission reevaluated registering Feta as a PDO, taking into account production in other EU countries and re-registered feta as a PDO in Commission Regulation (EC) No 1829/2002. This decision was appealed again at CJEU by Denmark and Germany. In 2005, the CJEU upheld the Commission Regulation. It indicated that indeed the term was generic in some EU countries and that production also took place outside Greece, but that on the other hand the geographical region in Greece was well defined and that even non-Greek producers often appealed to the status of Feta as a Greek product through the choice of packaging. 

The European Commission gave other nations five years to find a new name for their feta cheese or stop production. Because of the decision by the European Union, Danish dairy company Arla Foods changed the name of its white cheese products to Apetina, which is also the name of an Arla food brand established in 1991. When needed to describe an imitation feta, names such as "salad cheese" and "Greek-style cheese" are used. 

The EU included Feta in several Associations Agreements, Free Trade Agreements and agreements on the recognition of Geographical Indications, which led to the expansion of protection of the term Feta. Exporters from the EU to foreign markets outside the territories covered by these agreements, are not subject to the European Commission rules. As such, the non-Greek EU cheese sold abroad is often labeled as feta.

In 2013, an agreement was reached with Canada (CETA) in which Canadian feta manufacturers retained their rights to continue producing feta while new entrants to the market would label the product "feta-style/type cheese". In other markets such as the United States, Australia, New Zealand and elsewhere, full generic usage of the term "feta" continues.

Some cheeses from the EU were renamed. In 2007, the British cheese Yorkshire Feta was renamed to Fine Fettle Yorkshire.

Nutrition

Like many dairy products, feta has significant amounts of calcium and phosphorus; however, feta is higher in water and thus lower in fat and calories than aged cheeses like Parmigiano-Reggiano or Cheddar. The cheese may contain beneficial probiotics.

Feta, as a sheep dairy product, contains up to 1.9% conjugated linoleic acid (CLA), which is about 0.8% of its fat content.

Feta cheese is very high in salt, at over 400 mg sodium per 100 calories.

Similar cheeses

Similar cheeses can be found in other countries, such as:

 Albania (djathë i bardhë or djathë i Gjirokastrës)
 Armenia (Չանախ chanakh - cheese made in a chan, a type of crock)
 Azerbaijan (ağ pendir)
 Bosnia (Travnički/Vlašićki sir, lit. "cheese from Vlašić/Travnik") 
 Bulgaria (бяло сирене, lit. "white cheese")
 Canada (feta style cheese, or simply feta for those companies producing the cheese prior to October 2013)
 Czech Republic (balkánský sýr, lit. "Balkan cheese")
 Egypt (domiati)
 Finland (salaattijuusto, "salad cheese")
 Georgia (ყველი, kveli, lit. "cheese")
 Germany (Schafskäse, "sheep cheese")
 Hungary (juhturo)
 Iran (Lighvan cheese;  panīr-e līghvān)
 Israel (gvina bulgarit, lit. "Bulgarian cheese")
 Italy (casu 'e fitta Sardinia)
 Lebanon (lit. "Bulgarian cheese")
 North Macedonia (сирење, sirenje)
 Romania (brânză telemea)
 Russia (брынза, brynza)
 Serbia (сир, sir as a common name; сирење, sirenje in South, including Kosovo Serb; and brinza in north and east Serbia within Slovak and Aromanian populations)
 Slovakia (bryndza and Balkánsky syr, lit. "Balkan cheese")
 Spain (Queso de Burgos, lit. "Burgos cheese")
 Sudan (gibna beyda, lit. "white cheese")
 Turkey (beyaz peynir, lit. "white cheese")
 Ukraine (бринза, brynza)
 United Kingdom (Salad cheese)

See also

Citations

General and cited references

Further reading

External links
 International Feta Day

Cheeses with designation of origin protected in the European Union
Greek cheeses
Greek products with protected designation of origin
Goat's-milk cheeses
Mixed-milk cheeses
Sheep's-milk cheeses